The Geo Super Football League or SFL is the first proper professional inter-city football league of Pakistan, with the support of the PFF. It was established in 2007 and is the first time that Pakistani club football matches are telecast live on television via GEO Super. The SFL runs separate to the Pakistan Premier League and at the moment, the winners of the SFL will not be declared the official champions of Pakistan like the PPL winners.

In the inaugural season as well as the second season (2010), all matches were being played in Karachi's Peoples Football Stadium.

Introduction

Geo TV Network and the Pakistan Football Federation came together in 2006 and began work on establishing Pakistan’s first national inter-city football league to be televised and broadcast live on GEO Super.

The Geo Super Football League (SFL) was created as a way to fuse Pakistan's football talent, with experienced internationals playing with youth, and to develop football in Pakistan.

It would be a new top flight league, and the first time the teams will be professional and non departmental. Instead, they represent Pakistan's major cities. Aspiring stars were selected after a gruelling nationwide hunt of all aspiring football players, and will make up half of the team.

Thousands of youngsters and experienced players turned out at trials in Lahore, Karachi, Islamabad, Peshawar and Quetta, which took place between 17 and 25 June.

Given the level of interest, the selection committee, which consists of members of the PFF and Geo TV Network, had their work cut out for them. Over a hundred matches were held in all the locations in varying degrees of heat and weather conditions. Each player was given an ample chance to prove themselves through these matches, which revealed their ability to perform in real-time, tense situations.

Each player was individually discussed during the matches and in serious post-match analysis of every match that was played, before final selections took place.

The current champions are "Islamabad United" winning 4-3 on penalties in the final against Karachi Bazigar

Also The finals of the season 2007 ended in penalties

The Identity and Graphics including the logo is designed by Shahzad Nawaz

Training camps

Thirty players for each of the five teams were taken to camp, and only twenty each were selected to participate. The players were tested for their football skills, as well as their mental and physical toughness. Individual drills, team drills, strength and stamina conditioning were the main focus of the training camps to prepare the teams for their first ever national exposure.

Teams

The SFL currently is made up of five teams, representative of five different cities. Each team is composed of national and international players who are experienced in both local and international football. For the first time, the best players of the nation will come together under the umbrella of these five cities to compete for the first national inter-city football league. The names of the teams are the following:

 Tribe F.C. Peshawar
 Islamabad United
 Lahore Lajpaals F.C.
 Quetta Zorawar
 Karachi Bazigar

Records & statistics
 First match: Karachi Bazigars v Lahore Lajpaals (20 July 2007)
 Biggest winning margin: 4 goals
 Lahore Lajpaals 4–0 Tribe FC Peshawar (16 August 2007)
 Most wins in a season: 6 matches – Lahore Lajpaals
 Most loss in a season: 6 matches – Tribe FC Peshawar
 Most goals in a match: 6 goals
 Karachi Energy 4–2 Islamabad United (28 July 2010)
 Most goals in a match by a single player: 3 goals – Mohammad Shoaib (Lahore Lajpaals)
 Lahore Lajpaals 4–0 Tribe FC Peshawar (16 August 2007)
 Most goals in a season by a single player: 8 goals
 Mohammad Shoaib (Lahore Lajpaals)
 Haroon Arshad (Lahore Lajpaals)
 Most goals scored by a team in a season: 15 goals – Lahore Lajaals
 Fewest goals scored by a team in a season: 2 goals – Tribe FC Peshawar
 Most goals conceded by a team in a season: 16 goals – Tribe FC Peshawar
 Fewest goals conceded by a team in a season: 5 goals – Karachi Bazigars
 Player of the season: Haroon Arshad – 2007 and 2010

Top scorer
 2007: Arif Mehmood (8 goals)
 2010: Muhammad Rasool (6 goals)

Results

See also
Football in Pakistan
Pakistan Premier League

External links
Geo Super Football League official site
Pakistan Football Federation

 
Football leagues in Pakistan